Lady Jersey may refer to:

Frances Villiers, Countess of Jersey (1753–1821)
Sarah Villiers, Countess of Jersey (1785–1867)
Margaret Child-Villiers, Countess of Jersey (1849-1945)